South.Point Tuggeranong (previously Tuggeranong Hyperdome) is a two-storey regional shopping centre located in Greenway, Australian Capital Territory, servicing the district of Tuggeranong.

Ownership

South.Point Tuggeranong is a regional shopping centre with a Gross Lettable Area of 70,298 square metres. The centre was established in 1987 and is managed by Leda Holdings.

History
It was officially opened in 1987 as Hyperdome Shopping Centre and has had incremental expansions over time. It underwent subsequent development and expansion between 1997 and 1999. In 2006 when Centro became managers as well as part owners of the shopping centre, a minor redevelopment of the shopping centre was completed. The development included refurbishment of the inner and outer facades, additional retail stores, new Centro Signature sections and construction also began on a new dining and entertainment precinct along Anketell Street. This outdoor precinct was later named SouthLife on Anketell. From 1 December 2016 Leda Holdings regained full ownership and management of the centre. It was renamed South.Point on 10 May 2018. (although many locals who lived in the area before May 2018 still call it the Hyperdome).

Retailers
Major retailers in the centre include:
Coles supermarket (4,712m²)
Kmart discount department store (7,568m²) 
Target discount department store (6,566m²)
Woolworths supermarket (5,568m²)
Big W discount department store (6,996m²)
Harris Scarfe discount department store
JB-Hi-Fi Home Electronics Store
TK Maxx discount department store
Rebel sports store
Limelight cinema complex
The Reject Shop discount variety store
Myer department store (formerly, closed in 2012)

The centre is also home to 183 specialty retailers, eateries and service providers.

Location and Transport

South.Point is central to the Tuggeranong Town Centre. The centre faces onto Anketell Street to the east, Pitman Street to the north and Reed Street to the south. Between the main centre and Athllon Drive, to the west, is the South.Point Lifestyle Centre (formerly Tuggeranong Hyperdome House and Home Centre, and more recently Hyperdome Lifestyle Centre). Access to 2,366 parking spaces is off Pitman and Reed Streets. Tuggeranong Interchange on the other side of Pitman Street is served by ACTION.

References

External links
South.Point website

Canberra urban places
Shopping centres in the Australian Capital Territory
Shopping malls established in 1987
1987 establishments in Australia